The 1974 Paris–Nice was the 32nd edition of the Paris–Nice cycle race and was held from 9 March to 16 March 1974. The race started in Paris and finished in Nice. The race was won by Joop Zoetemelk of the Gan team.

General classification

References

1974
1974 in road cycling
1974 in French sport
March 1974 sports events in Europe
1974 Super Prestige Pernod